Ricardo Sanchez (born 1953) is a retired United States Army lieutenant general.

Ricardo Sanchez or Sánchez may also refer to:

Ricardo Sánchez (poet) (1941–1995), Chicano poet
Ricardo Sanchez (journalist) (born 1958), Cuban–American journalist, radio host, and author
Ricardo Sanchez (musician) (born 1967), American musician
Ricardo Sánchez (water polo) (born 1971), Spanish water polo player
Ricardo Sánchez Gálvez (born 1974), Mexican politician
Ricardo Sánchez (footballer) (born 1982), Mexican soccer player
Ricardo Sánchez Mujica (born 1983), Venezuelan politician and former student leader
Ricky Sánchez (born 1987), Puerto Rican professional basketball player
Ricardo Sánchez (field hockey) (born 1992), Spanish field hockey player
Richard Sánchez (Paraguayan footballer) (born 1996), Paraguayan footballer
Ricardo Sánchez (baseball) (born 1997), baseball player

See also
 Richard Sánchez (disambiguation)